William Willcox Perrin (11 August 184827 June 1934) was an Anglican bishop in the late 19th and early 20th centuries.

Perrin was born at Westbury-on-Trym, Somersetshire, on 11 August 1848 and educated at both King's College London and Trinity College, Oxford. Ordained in 1870, he began his ministry with a curacy at St Mary's Southampton and was then vicar of St Luke's in the same city before his ordination to the episcopate as the Bishop of British Columbia. He was consecrated a bishop on 24 March 1893, by Edward White Benson, Archbishop of Canterbury, at Westminster Abbey. He was later translated to be the Bishop of Willesden. During this period he was also the rector of St Andrew Undershaft A noted Freemason (he kept the rectory until his death). He died on 27 June 1934 and is buried in the churchyard of St John-at-Hampstead Church, London. His sister Edith was a prominent social reformer.

Perrin unveiled and dedicated the Hampstead War Memorial in May 1922.

He retired in summer 1929, resigning his see in time for his successor's consecration on the Feast of St James (25 July). He became an Assistant Bishop of London until his death — he apparently retained oversight of Hampstead deanery throughout.

References

1848 births
1934 deaths
Anglican bishops of British Columbia
Bishops of Willesden
Alumni of Trinity College, Oxford
19th-century Anglican Church of Canada bishops
20th-century Church of England bishops
Burials at St John-at-Hampstead
Freemasons of the United Grand Lodge of England
20th-century Anglican Church of Canada bishops